The 1975 NAIA Division I football season was the 20th season of college football sponsored by the NAIA, was the sixth season of play of the top division of the NAIA's two-division structure for football.

The season was played from August to November 1975 and culminated in the 1975 NAIA Division I Champion Bowl, played on December 13, 1975 on the campus of Texas A&I University in Kingsville, Texas. Texas A&I defeated  in the Champion Bowl, 37–0, to win their fourth, and second consecutive, NAIA national title.

Conference realignment

Conference changes
 This was the first season of football for South Atlantic Conference. The league comprised eight teams from North Carolina and South Carolina, with seven being former members of the Carolinas Conference. 
 This was the final season of play for the Great Plains Athletic Conference, which disbanded after only four seasons. The seven members, spread across Colorado, Kansas, and Nebraska, would subsequently all depart for other NAIA conferences.

Membership changes

Conference standings

Postseason

See also
 1975 NAIA Division II football season
 1975 NCAA Division I football season
 1975 NCAA Division II football season
 1975 NCAA Division III football season

References

 
NAIA Football National Championship